Niobium disulfide is the chemical compound with the formula NbS2. It is a black layered solid that can be exfoliated into ultrathin grayish sheets similar to other transition metal dichalcogenides. These layers exhibit superconductivity, where the transition temperature increases from ca. 2 to 6 K with the layer thickness increasing from 6 to 12 nm, and then saturates with thickness.

References

Niobium(IV) compounds
Sulfides
Transition metal dichalcogenides
Monolayers